The Amarillo Starlight is the largest diamond found by a park visitor in the Crater of Diamonds State Park in Arkansas since 1972, when it was established as a state park. The Amarillo Starlight was found by W. W. Johnson of Amarillo, Texas in 1975 while he was vacationing at the park with his family. When unearthed, it was a  white diamond, but it has since been cut into a  marquise shape. Its value has been estimated between $150,000 and $175,000.

See also
 List of diamonds

References

 Crater of Diamonds State Park
 Largest diamond found in park

Diamonds originating in the United States
Pike County, Arkansas
1975 in Arkansas
Individual diamonds